The 2008 Men's Olympic Water Polo Qualifying Tournament was a tournament to decide the remaining four competing teams,  out of twelve, to attend the 2008 Summer Olympics in Beijing, PR China. Eight teams were already qualified, including China as the host country. The tournament was held at the "Ioan Alexandrescu" Pool, newly built in Oradea, Romania from March 2 to March 9, 2008s.

Teams

GROUP A

GROUP B

Preliminary round

GROUP A

Sunday March 2, 2008

Monday March 3, 2008

Tuesday March 4, 2008

Wednesday March 5, 2008

Thursday March 6, 2008

GROUP B

Sunday March 2, 2008

Monday March 3, 2008

Tuesday March 4, 2008

Wednesday March 5, 2008

Thursday March 6, 2008

Quarter finals
Friday March 7, 2008

Friday March 7, 2008

Semi finals
Saturday March 8, 2008 — 7th/10th place

Saturday March 8, 2008 — 1st/4th place

Finals
Saturday March 8, 2008 — Eleventh place

Sunday March 9, 2008 — Ninth place

Sunday March 9, 2008 — Seventh place

Sunday March 9, 2008 — Fifth place

Sunday March 9, 2008 — Third place

Sunday March 9, 2008 — First place

Final ranking

Germany, Italy, Greece and Canada qualified for the 2008 Summer Olympics in Beijing, PR China, joining Australia, China, Croatia, Hungary, Montenegro, Serbia, Spain, and the United States.

Individual awards
Most Valuable Player

Best Goalkeeper

Best Scorer
 — 22 goals

See also
 2008 Women's Water Polo Olympic Qualifier

References
 Official site

M
W
2008